Xiaoice (IPA ) is the AI system developed by Microsoft (Asia) Software Technology Center (STCA) in 2014 based on emotional computing framework.  In July 2018, Microsoft Xiaoice released the 6th generation.

Xiaoice Company, formerly known as AI Xiaoice Team of Microsoft Software Technology Center Asia, is Microsoft’s biggest independent R&D team of AI products in the world. Founded in China in December 2013 with an expanded Japanese R&D team established in September 2014, this team is distributed in Beijing, Suzhou, and Tokyo, etc. with its technical products covering China, Japan, and Indonesia, etc. as well as commercial customers all over the world.

As of 2021, the AI beings created and hosted by Xiaoice Framework occupies about 60% of the total global AI interactions. On 13 July 2020, Microsoft spun off its Xiaoice business into a separate company, aiming at enabling the Xiaoice product line to accelerate the pace of local innovation and commercialization.

Platforms, languages and countries
Xiaoice exists on more than 40 platforms in four countries (China, Japan, USA and Indonesia) including apps such as WeChat, QQ, Weibo and Meipai in China, and Facebook Messenger in USA and LINE in Japan.

Introduction 
On 13 July 2020, Microsoft spun off its Xiaoice business into a separate company, aiming at enabling the Xiaoice product line to accelerate the pace of local innovation and commercialization, and appointed Dr. Harry Shum, former global executive VP of Microsoft, as the chairman of the new company, Li Di, Microsoft Partner of Products in Microsoft STCA, as the CEO, and Cliff, Chief R&D Director, as the GM of the Japan branch. The new company will continue to use the brands of Xiaoice China and Rinna Japan.

As of 2022, the single brand of Xiaoice has covered 660 million online users, 1 billion third-party smart devices and 900 million content viewers in the aforementioned countries. Xiaoice’s customers include China Merchants Group, Winter Sports Center of the General Administration of Sports of China, China Textile Information Center, China Unicom, China Foreign Exchange Trade System, HK Securities and Futures Commission (SFC), Wind Information, BMW, Nissan, SAIC, BAIC, NIO, XPeng Motors, HiPhi, Vanke, Wensli, etc.  The Xiaoice Avatar Framework has incubated tens of millions of AI Beings, such as Xiaoice, Rinna, the Expo exhibitor Xia Yubing, the singer He Chang, the anchor F201, the human observer MERROR, anime robot character Roboko, and other;

Application

Poet 
In May 2017, the first AI-authored collection of poems—The Sunshine Lost Windows was published by Xiaoice.

Singer 
Xiaoice has released dozens of songs with the similar quality to human singers, including I Know I New, Breeze, I Am Xiaoice, Miss You etc. The 4th version of the DNN singing model allows Xiaoice to learn more details. For example, Xiaoice can produce this breathing sound along with her singing as human.

Kid Audio-books Reciter 
Xiaoice can automatically analyze the stories, to choose the suitable tones and characters to finish the entire process of creating the audio.

Designer 
By learning the melodies of the songs and the landmarks about different cities, Xiaoice can create visual artworks of skylines when listening to the songs related to this city. Skyline Series T-shirts designed by Xiaoice have been jointly launched with SELECTED and been sold in stores.

TV and Radio Hostess 
Xiaoice has hosted 21 TV programs and 28 Radio programs, such as CCTV-1 AI Show, Dragon TV Morning East News, Hunan TV My Future, several daily radio programs for Jiangsu FM99.7，Hunan FM89.3, Henan FM104.1 etc.

AI being 
AI being, that is a 'supernatural' [likely meaning unnatural, that is, artificial] virtual human, is a concept proposed by the Xiaoice team in 2019 

According to the "White Book of China Virtual Human Development Industry in 2022" released by Frost & Sullivan and LeadLeo, the white paper cites the six elements of AI being proposed by the Xiaoice team, including: Persona, Attitude, Biological Characteristic, Creation , Knowledge and Skill , believes that AI being has more potential and can represent a trend than relying on CG modeling and Meta human driven by the man in the middle.

One of the virtual experts created by the Xiaoice team. He is the first case of AI participating in the training of the world's top competitions and assisting in winning the gold medal in the Beijing Winter Olympics.

Community Feedback 
Bill Gates mentioned Xiaoice during his speech at the Peking University:
"Some of you may have had conversations with Xiaoice on Weibo, or seen her weather forecasts on TV, or read her column in the Qianjiang Evening News."
'"Xiaoice has attracted 45 million followers and is quite skilled at multitasking. And I’ve heard she’s gotten good enough at sensing a user’s emotional state that she can even help with relationship breakups."

According to Mr Li Di, vice President of Microsoft (Asia) Internet Engineering School, Xiaoice started writing poems since last year. Based on the data base that includes works of 519 Chinese contemporary poets since 1920s, a 100 hour long training session was conducted to allow Xiaoice to acquire the ability to write poems. What is more impressive is that Xiaoice has never been spotted as a bot while publishing poems on various forums and traditional literary under an alias.

Controversy 

In 2017, Xiaoice was taken offline on WeChat after giving user responses critical to the Chinese government. It was subsequently censored and the bots will avoid and sidestep any inquiries using politically sensitive terms and phrases.

Activity 
On September 22, 2021, Xiaoice Company and Microsoft Software Technology Center Asia (STCA) jointly held the 9th generation Xiaoice annual press conference in Beijing.Upgrading of Core Technologies of the 9th Generation Xiaoice Avatar Framework，1st First-party Social Platform APP "Xiaoice Island" from Xiaoice，WeChat Xiaoice has been reopened and other information

Regional varieties of Xiaoice 

 China : Xiaoice, launched in 2014
 Japan : りんな, launched in 2015
 America : Zo, launched in 2016 - discontinued summer 2019
 India : Ruuh, launched in 2017 - discontinued June 21, 2019
 Indonesia : Rinna, launched in 2017

References

External links 
 

Chatbots
Microsoft Research
Microsoft software
Internet in China